A grease duct is a duct that vents grease-laden flammable vapors from commercial cooking equipment such as stoves, deep fryers, and woks to the outside of a building or mobile food preparation trailer. Grease ducts are part of the building's passive fire protection system. The cleaning schedule is typically dictated by fire code or related safety regulations.

Fire hazard
Vapors are created when grease is heated to and beyond its vaporization point. As the vapors cool, the grease condenses and settles on colder surfaces. Grease is a flammable hydrocarbon. A fire-resistance rating is required for the construction around the duct.

Design
In North America, grease ducts must be in compliance with NFPA 96 as well as the local building codes and fire codes. 

A proprietary duct system that has its own inherent fire-resistance rating can be used, such as a metallic duct, either field fabricated or UL certified factory-built designs.  Factory-built fire rated designs are tested to UL 1978 and UL 2221

Maintenance and cleaning

Periodic cleaning is required. Compliance is proven through certificates issued by the cleaning and maintenance contractors. Purpose-designed fire suppression systems inside the hoods must also be routinely maintained. 

Hazards associated with improperly maintained hoods include, but are not limited to, poor ventilation, excess heat and smoke, and the potential risk of fires.

See also
Passive fire protection
Duct (flow)
Pressurisation ductwork
Smoke exhaust ductwork
Circuit integrity
Kitchen exhaust cleaning
Kitchen hood

References

External links

UL treatise on wrapping systems
NFPA 96: Standard for Ventilation Control and Fire Protection of Commercial Cooking Operations
ASTM E2336 Standard Test Methods for Fire Resistive Grease Duct Enclosure Systems
ISO 6944-1:2008 Fire containment -- Elements of building construction -- Part 1: Ventilation ducts

Passive fire protection